Levski Peak, or Ambaritsa is a peak in the Central Balkan Mountains in Lovech Province, Bulgaria. It is named after the famous Bulgarian revolutionary Vasil Levski.

The peak is more famous with its old name, Ambaritsa. According to the local legends Krali Marko's granaries were located in the area. The Ambaritsa Refuge is situated on its northern slopes, at 2 hours of the peak.

Mountains of Bulgaria
Balkan mountains
Two-thousanders of Bulgaria
Landforms of Lovech Province